Gottfried Ernst Pestel originally Bestel(Berka 1654-1732) was a German composer and organist at Weida, Thuringia and Altenburg south of Leipzig. He was princely organist in the castle church from 1686-1732, after which he was succeeded by Christian Lorenz.

Works, editions and recordings
17 organ preludes in the Mylauer-Tabulaturbuch
 Ciaconna (in Schneeberger Orgelbuch um 1705)
Cantata Komm du schoene Freudenkrone (recording on collection by Sächsisches Vocalensemble, Batzdorfer Hofkapelle, directed Matthias Jung CPO 2009)

References

German organists
German male organists
German Baroque composers
1654 births
1732 deaths
18th-century keyboardists
18th-century classical composers
German classical composers
German male classical composers
18th-century German composers
18th-century German male musicians